Jacqueline Foster, Baroness Foster of Oxton,  (née Renshaw)  is a British Conservative politician and a former Member of the European Parliament for the North West England region.

In October 2019 she was appointed Dame Commander of the Most Excellent Order of the British Empire. In December 2020, it was announced she would be conferred a Life Peerage after a nomination by Prime Minister Boris Johnson as part of the 2020 Political Honours. In January 2021, she was elevated to the Lords as Baroness Foster of Oxton, of Oxton in the County of Merseyside.

Early career
Jacqueline Foster was born in Liverpool and educated at Prescot Girls' Grammar School. She worked for British Airways for more than twenty years.

Between 1981 and '85 she left British Airways and became Area Manager in Austria for Horizon, a British Tour Operator before returning to British Airways four years later. In 1989, she was one of the founder members of Cabin Crew '89, an independent trade union and served as the Deputy General Secretary. She continued with British Airways until she was elected as an MEP in 1999. She also lived and worked in France and Spain. She speaks French and German.

Political involvement

In 1988, following Margaret Thatcher's Bruges Speech, she opposed Britain joining a single European currency as well as signing up to the Social Chapter. Despite her positive experiences living and working in Europe, she maintained a Euro-scepticism due to her concern about the future of EU integration. She openly supported the United Kingdom leaving the EU following the Referendum in 2016.

Foster combined her trade union activities with membership of the Conservative Party, serving as Vice Chairman of Twickenham Conservative Association as well as holding a variety of voluntary political offices for the Greater London area. In the 1992 general election, she was the Conservative candidate in Newham South, a Labour-held seat in east London. Against the national trend, Foster cut the Labour majority. She was shortlisted as the candidate for Eastleigh in the by-election of 1994 but lost out in selection.

1997 UK general election
She continued to look for selection and in November 1995 was beaten by Eric Forth in the selection for Bromley and Chislehurst. In August 1996 she was selected for the marginal seat of Peterborough, where sitting Conservative MP Brian Mawhinney was moving to an adjacent constituency. She moved to Peterborough to fight the campaign and was among the Conservative candidates at that election who declared their personal opposition to the single European currency.

1999 European election
At the 1999 European Parliament election, Foster was selected by Conservatives in the North West as fifth on their list. She won the last seat available on the list system.

Work as MEP

During this first mandate (1999-2004), she was elected annually as the chairman of the Backbench Committee of MEPs.

Her political responsibilities were as the Conservative Spokesman on Transport and Tourism and as a Member of the Industry Committee. She specialised in the aviation sector, with other responsibilities including maritime, road and rail.

Following 9/11 Foster was the Rapporteur/draftsman for the Regulation which introduced minimum standards of security at airports across Europe. This included new rules which required airport staff to be security screened airside, when entering secure areas, as was the case in the United Kingdom. 

She supported moves to require airlines to compensate passengers 'bumped' off flights. Other areas she focused on included:
 Single European Sky, ATM, GNSS, Galileo (new satellite systems);
 The creation of the European Air Safety Agency (EASA); Occurrence reporting
 Slots, Noise Ground-handling and Pax rights;
 Crew operations and Open Skies agreements.
She was also a member of the Sky & Space Parliamentary Intergroup.

She was also a Member of the Animal Welfare Parliamentary Intergroup.

Defeat in 2004; re-election in 2009
Foster was re-selected as a candidate for the 2004 European Parliament election in fourth position on the Conservative list, so was not re-elected when the Conservatives won only three seats. Having specialised in the aviation sector, she became an adviser to Airbus on EU legislation following which she was appointed Head of European Affairs for the Aerospace, Space and Defence Industries of Europe (ASD), based in Brussels (2005-2009). 

In 2009 she was placed third on the Conservative list for the North West in the European Parliament election and was elected as an MEP, with the Conservatives winning three seats for a second time.  She was, again, appointed as the Transport Spokesman and also served as a Vice President of the Sky & Space and Animal Welfare Parliamentary Intergroups and as a Member of the EU-US Delegation. In addition she sat as a member of the Environment Committee. She was elected Deputy Leader of the Conservative delegation of MEPs in 2013, and was re-elected annually until 2019. 
In 2013, she argued against the Conservative Party having an electoral pact with UK Independence Party.

2014 European election

Foster topped the ballot of the North West Candidates list for the 2014 European Parliament election. The Conservatives retained two MEPs - Foster and Sajjad Karim. 

Following the election she was re-appointed as a Transport Spokesman, specialising in the aviation and aerospace sectors as before and was also the Spokesman on Tourism. She was the draftsman of the groundbreaking 'Report on the Safe Use of RPAS' (drones) in the civil sector. She remained on the Environment Committee. She continued to work on aviation security issues with American authorities and other countries around the globe. She was re-elected as a Vice-President of both the Sky & Space and Animal Welfare Parliamentary Intergroups. She remained a Member of the EU/US Parliamentary Delegation and was elected Vice-President of the Australia/New Zealand Delegation with the focus on securing future trade deals.

She was regularly invited to address aviation/aerospace conferences, such as the Royal Aeronautical Society (drones & emissions trading), as well as being regularly called upon by the media and other organisations for political comment on all aspects of both sectors. She is a member of the RAeS as well as the European Aviation Club.

Foster did not contest the 2019 European Election and fully supports the UK position on Brexit.

As an MEP Foster was also the Spokesman on Maritime Affairs and served as a Director and Board Member of Mersey Maritime Ltd. from 2016 to June 2019. (Unpaid)

She was appointed President of the North West Conservative Clubs in 2010.

Foster sits as a Senior Advisor on the Drone Delivery Group.(Unpaid)

Foster was appointed Dame Commander of the Order of the British Empire (DBE) in the 2019 Birthday Honours.

House of Lords 
Foster was introduced in to the House of Lords on the 9th February 2021. 
She has spoken out on the devastating impact of Covid on the Aviation and Tourism and hospitality sectors and cover up by the Chinese Authorities on its source. In addition, she vehemently opposed the introduction of vaccine passports along with other restrictions such as keeping children out of school, lockdowns in general and mandatory vaccinations for Care and NHS workers. [Hansard]
She is a Vice Chairman of the APPG Pandemic Group. 

She is also a Vice Chairman of the APPG on the future of Aviation along with the APPGs on Aerospace, Business Travel, General Aviation.

She supports the Rwanda asylum plan.

Media 
Foster is a regular contributor on the UK TV channel, GB News

References

Living people
Conservative Party (UK) MEPs
20th-century women MEPs for England
21st-century women MEPs for England
MEPs for England 1999–2004
MEPs for England 2009–2014
MEPs for England 2014–2019
Year of birth missing (living people)
Dames Commander of the Order of the British Empire
Conservative Party (UK) life peers
Conservative Party (UK) parliamentary candidates
Life peeresses created by Elizabeth II
Politicians from Liverpool